The Atimokateiw River is a tributary of the south shore of the Gouin Reservoir, flowing into the territory of the town of La Tuque, in the area of Mauricie, Quebec, Canada.

The Atimokateiw River flows entirely in the township of Aubin, to the south-east of the Gouin Reservoir. Forestry is the main economic activity of this valley; recreational tourism activities, second.

This road branch connects to route 400 which bypasses the south-eastern part of the Gouin Reservoir. It connects the village of Parent, Quebec (via the vallée of Bazin River) and the village Wemotaci, Quebec which is located west of La Tuque, Quebec.

The surface of the Atimokateiw River is usually frozen from mid-November to the end of April, however, safe ice circulation is generally from early December to late March.

Geography

Toponymy 
This hydronym is of aboriginal origin.

The toponym "Atimokateiw River" was formalized on May 31, 1985 at the Commission de toponymie du Québec.

Notes and references

See also 

Rivers of Mauricie
Tributaries of the Saint-Maurice River
La Tuque, Quebec